David Graham may refer to:

Authors and intellectuals
David Graham (American poet), American writer and poet
David Graham (author) (1919–1994), pen name of British writer Robert Hale
David Graham (Canadian academic), Canadian academic administrator and literary historian
David Crockett Graham (1884–1961), American Baptist minister and polymath

Sports
David Graham (Irish cricketer) (1922–2009), Northern Irish cricketer
David Graham (English cricketer) (born 1971), English cricketer
David Graham (footballer, born 1978), Scottish footballer
David Graham (footballer, born 1983), Scottish footballer
David Graham (golfer) (born 1946), Australian golfer
David Graham (rugby union) (1875–1962), English rugby football player
David Graham (tennis) (born 1962), Australian former professional tennis player
Dave Graham (American football) (born 1939), former professional American football player
Dave Graham (climber) (born 1981), American professional rock climber

Arts
David Graham (actor) (born 1925), British character actor and voice artist

David Graham (photographer) (born 1952), American photographer
Davey Graham (1940–2008), English guitarist
David Graham (casting director) (1924–2015), American casting director
David Graham, "housemate" who appeared in Big Brother Australia 2006

Others
David de Burgh Graham (born 1981), Canadian Member of Parliament
David Graham (epidemiologist), United States FDA official who testified against Vioxx and the structuring of the FDA
David R. Graham (?–2017), Canadian businessman
David Graham (US politician) (born 1954), candidate for Attorney General of Delaware
David Graham, former cadet at the US Air Force Academy convicted of murder alongside Diane Zamora

See also